Stephen John Hughes (born 18 September 1976) is an English former professional footballer and pundit.

He played as a midfielder notably in the Premier League for Arsenal, Everton and Charlton Athletic, and in the Football League for Fulham, Watford, Coventry City and Walsall. He was capped at both England U18 and U21 level.

Club career
Hughes started his career at Arsenal, with whom he won the FA Youth Cup in 1994. He then made 16 first team appearances to earn a winners medal as Arsenal won the 1998 Premier League title. Hughes' highlight for that season was scoring twice as Arsenal defeated Chelsea 2–0 at home. He also made 6 appearances in Arsenal's FA Cup run that season, including the semi final against Wolves, but was left out of the squad for the 1998 FA Cup Final as they clinched the double. Another highlight was a 25-yard last minute equaliser against Leicester City at Filbert Street the following season. Altogether with Arsenal he made 76 senior appearances with 40 of them as a substitute, and scored 7 goals.

Hughes then moved to Everton in March 2000, for a fee of £3 million. He played 33 games for them before being released on a free transfer on 4 July 2001. He then moved on to First Division side Watford that same month, having scored his two Everton goals against them; once in the league and once in the FA Cup. He only managed 17 games in his first season due to injury. His contract was settled early in the 2002–03 season.

He signed for Charlton Athletic in August 2003. but made no appearances that season and subsequently left on a free transfer to join Coventry City in July 2004. He went on to become the club's captain and made over 150 appearances.

Personal life
After his retirement from football, Hughes returned to the Gunners as a commentator and pundit for Arsenal Player.

Career statistics

¹ includes FA Charity Shield and Football League Trophy.

Honours
Arsenal
Premier League: 1997–98
FA Charity Shield: 1998
FA Youth Cup: 1993–94

Individual
Coventry City Player of the Year: 2004–05
Coventry City Players' Player of the Year: 2004–05

References

External links

Stephen Hughes profile at the Coventry City official website

1976 births
Living people
People from Wokingham
English footballers
Association football midfielders
Arsenal F.C. players
Everton F.C. players
Fulham F.C. players
Watford F.C. players
Charlton Athletic F.C. players
Coventry City F.C. players
Walsall F.C. players
Premier League players
English Football League players
England under-21 international footballers